Homogentisic acid (2,5-dihydroxyphenylacetic acid) is a phenolic acid usually found in Arbutus unedo (strawberry-tree) honey. It is also present in the bacterial plant pathogen Xanthomonas campestris pv. phaseoli as well as in the yeast Yarrowia lipolytica where it is associated with the production of brown pigments. It is oxidatively dimerised to form hipposudoric acid, one of the main constituents of the 'blood sweat' of hippopotamuses.

It is less commonly known as melanic acid, the name chosen by William Prout.

Human pathology
Accumulation of excess homogentisic acid and its oxide, named alkapton, is a result of the failure of the enzyme homogentisic acid 1,2-dioxygenase (typically due to a mutation) in the degradative pathway of tyrosine, consequently associated with alkaptonuria.

Intermediate
It is an intermediate in the catabolism of aromatic amino acids such as phenylalanine and tyrosine.

4-Hydroxyphenylpyruvate (produced by transamination of tyrosine) is acted upon by the enzyme 4-hydroxyphenylpyruvate dioxygenase to yield homogentisate. If active and present, the enzyme homogentisate 1,2-dioxygenase further degrades homogentisic acid to yield 4-maleylacetoacetic acid.

References

Hydroquinones
Acetic acids
Hydroxy acids